Jordan Grant (born 15 August 1994) is a Serbian international professional rugby league footballer who plays as a  for the Melbourne Storm in the NRL.

Early life
Grant was born in Penrith, New South Wales, and is of Serbian and Aboriginal descent. He was educated at St Dominic's College, Penrith.

Grant played junior rugby league for the St Clair Comets, before signing with Penrith Panthers.

Playing career

Early career
Grant was a part of the Penrith Panthers junior development system. He then played in the NRL Under-20s for the Parramatta Eels in 2013, and the Wests Tigers in 2014.

In 2016, Grant was named player of the year for the Tigers' New South Wales Cup team. He represented  in their 2017 World Cup qualifying fixtures in October 2016.

In 2018, Grant moved to Queensland, playing for the Mackay Cutters in the Queensland Cup, living with teammates Nicho Hynes and Aaron Booth. After a year in Mackay, Grant transferred to the Redcliffe Dolphins in 2019.

Melbourne Storm
Grant signed with the Brisbane Tigers in the Queensland Cup ahead of the 2021 season.

In round 18 of the 2021 NRL season, Grant made his debut for the Melbourne club against the Newcastle Knights where they won 48–4.

Limited to just three NRL appearances for Melbourne in 2022, Grant played 12 of a possible 19 matches for the Brisbane Tigers, winning the club's best and fairest award.

References

External links
Melbourne Storm profile
Brisbane Tigers profile

1994 births
Living people
Australian rugby league players
Australian people of Serbian descent
Serbia national rugby league team players
Rugby league players from Penrith, New South Wales
Rugby league props
Melbourne Storm players
Mackay Cutters players
Redcliffe Dolphins players
Eastern Suburbs Tigers players